The 2022–23 Telenet UCI Cyclo-cross World Cup was a season-long cyclo-cross competition, organized by the Union Cycliste Internationale (UCI). The UCI Cyclo-cross World Cup took place between 9 October 2022 and 29 January 2023. This season the number of races was expanded to 14, whereas in regular seasons most recently only about 9 were organized. 

The defending champions ware Eli Iserbyt in the men's competition and Lucinda Brand in the women's competition, they were succeeded respectively by Laurens Sweeck and Fem van Empel, who both clinched the overall victory following the penultimate race, held in Benidorm

Points distribution
Points were awarded to all eligible riders at each race. From this season, the points awarded are according to the same scale for all categories, but only the top 25 riders receive points rather than the top 50. The top ten finishers received points according to the following table:

 Riders finishing in positions 11 to 25 also received points, going down from 15 points for 11th place by one point per place to 1 point for 25th place.
 Note that the points given here are entirely different from the UCI ranking points, which are distributed according to a different scale and determine starting order in races, but have no impact on World Cup standings.

Events

Points standings

Elite men

Elite women

U23 men

Junior men

Junior women

References

Sources

External links

World Cup
World Cup
UCI Cyclo-cross World Cup